Chacapampa or Chakapampa (Aymara and Quechua chaka bridge, pampa plain, "bridge plain") is one of twenty-eight districts of the province Huancayo in Peru.

References